Johnny Greenwood (born 29 July 1939) is an Australian country music singer. Greenwood recorded pop songs in London in the 1960s, before returning to record for RCA Australia. In 1973 Greenwood released a tribute single on RCA to the champion Australian boxer Tony Mundine. In the year 1975, he released his best known trucking song "Big Bill".

Discography

Albums
 Tibrogargan (1971)
 The Goondiwindi Grey (1973)
 The Singing Transport Man (1975)
 Johnny Greenwood (1977)
 Big Rigs and Truck Stops (1980)

EPs
 Just Another Mile To Go (1969)
 It's Time To Have Some Good Times (1992)

Singles
"Loving Arms" (1963)
"Star of the D.J. Show" (1964)
"Detroit City" (with Ellie Lavelle) (1966)
"The Goondiwindi Grey" (1973) - AUS #67	
"Our Champion - Tony Mundine " (1973)
"Big Bill" (1975)

Awards

Tamworth Songwriters Awards
The Tamworth Songwriters Association (TSA) is an annual songwriting contest for original country songs, awarded in January at the Tamworth Country Music Festival. They commenced in 1986.
 (wins only)
|-
| 2003
| Johnny Greenwood 
| Songmaker Award
| 
|-
| 2017
| Johnny Greenwood 
| Tex Morton Award
| 
|-

References

External links
 

1939 births
20th-century guitarists
21st-century guitarists
Australian country guitarists
Australian country singers
Australian country singer-songwriters
Living people
Australian male guitarists
Musicians from Brisbane
People from the Darling Downs
People from Wagga Wagga
21st-century Australian male singers
20th-century Australian male singers
Australian male singer-songwriters